Site 43, also known as SK-3 and SK-4, is a launch complex at the Plesetsk Cosmodrome in Russia. It consists of a two pads, Sites 43/3 and 43/4, and has been used by R-7 derived rockets since the early 1960s.

The site was originally built for use by R-7A Semyorka missiles. The first launch to use the complex was an R-7A test on 21 December 1965, from Site 43/3. The first launch from 43/4 followed on 25 July 1967.

After its retirement from service as a missile base, it was converted for use as a space launch complex. The first orbital launch was of a Voskhod rocket with Kosmos 313 on 3 December 1969. 

Both pads were damaged by explosions in the 1980s. At 16:01 UTC on 18 March 1980, 48 people were killed when a Vostok-2M exploded during fueling operations at Pad 4. The disaster injured dozens more, while damaging the pad so severely that it was not used again until 1984. On 18 June 1987, a Soyuz-U rocket exploded at liftoff on Pad 3. Both were rebuilt, and are in service as of 2009.

References

 
 
 

Plesetsk Cosmodrome